Arroz junto (rice together) is a Puerto Rican rice dish cooked with beans and meat in one pot.

Origin

Method
Rice, beans, and usually some kind of meat, are combined in the same pot. Sofrito, meat, olives, capers and spices are cooked in annatto oil. Annatto adds flavor and tints the rice a bright orange color. Once sofrito is cooked, rice and beans are added with liquid.

Variations
Some arroz junto dishes are given other names such as Arroz con gandules, Arroz con maiz, and Arroz bago (rice, chickpeas, ground meat and beer). Pinto or red beans are usually accompanied with smoked ham or longaniza, black beans with bacon, and sweet peas with chicken and chorizo (Arroz con pollo).

Puerto Rican cuisine
Latin American rice dishes
Legume dishes